Axel Oxenstierna palace  is a Mannerist architecture style  building situated in the Old Town of Stockholm, Sweden.

History

Designed by the architect Jean de la Vallée (ca 1620–1696) for Chancellor Axel Oxenstierna  (1583 – 1654) and began construction in 1653. The palace became the headquarters for the 1668-1680 Swedish Central Bank.

The palace is well conserved in particular with regard to the exterior. The building also has a well-preserved interior with  basically an original floor plan.  The building has been a state monument since 1935.  The facade was renovated in 2013 by the Swedish Property Agency. An earlier refurbishment of the premises was carried out in 1993–94.

See also
Axel Oxenstierna

References

Other sources
Ohlsson, Martin A. (1951) Axel Oxenstiernas palats  (Stockholm: Forum bokförlag) 

Houses completed in the 17th century
Palaces in Stockholm
Listed buildings in Stockholm
17th-century establishments in Sweden
17th century in Stockholm